Butterfat or milkfat  is the fatty portion of milk.  Milk and cream are often sold according to the amount of butterfat they contain.

Composition 

Butterfat is mainly composed of triglycerides. Each triglyceride contains three fatty acids. Butterfat triglycerides contain the following amounts of fatty acids (by mass fraction):

Butterfat contains about 3% trans fat, which is slightly less than 0.5 grams per US tablespoon. Trans fats occur naturally in meat and milk from ruminants. The predominant kind of trans fat found in milk is vaccenic fatty acid. Trans fats may be also found in some industrially produced foods, such as shortenings obtained by hydrogenation of vegetable oils. In light of recognized scientific evidence, nutritional authorities consider all trans fats equally harmful for health and recommend that their consumption be reduced to trace amounts.
However, two Canadian studies have shown that vaccenic acid could be beneficial compared to vegetable shortenings containing trans fats, or a mixture of pork lard and soy fat, by lowering total LDL and triglyceride levels. A study by the US Department of Agriculture showed that vaccenic acid raises both HDL and LDL cholesterol, whereas industrial trans fats only raise LDL with no beneficial effect on HDL.

U.S. standards 
 
In the U.S., there are federal standards for butterfat content of dairy products. Many other countries also have standards for minimum fat levels in dairy products. Commercial products generally contain the minimum legal amount of fat with any excess being removed to make cream, a valuable commodity.

 Milks
 Non-fat milk, also labeled "fat-free milk" or "skim milk", contains less than 0.5% fat
 Low-fat milk is 1% fat
 Reduced-fat milk is 2% fat
 Whole milk contains at least 3.25% fat
 Cheeses
 Dry curd and nonfat cottage cheese contain less than 0.5% fat
 Lowfat cottage cheese contains 0.5–2% fat
 Cottage cheese contains at least 4% fat
 Swiss cheese contains at least 43% fat relative to the total solids
 Cheddar cheese contains at least 50% fat relative to the total solids
 Frozen desserts
 sherbet contains 1–2% fat
 Lowfat ice cream, also called ice milk, contains no more than 2.6% fat
 Ice cream contains at least 10% fat
 Frozen custard, like ice cream, contains at least 10% fat, but it also must contain at least 1.4% egg yolk solids
 Creams
 Half and half contains 10.5–18% fat
 Light cream and sour cream contain 18–30% fat
 Light whipping cream (often called simply "whipping cream") contains 30–36% fat
 Heavy cream contains a minimum of 36% fat
 Manufacturer's cream (not federally regulated) contains 40% fat
 Butter (including whipped butter) contains at least 80% fat

See also 
 Buttermilk
 Clarified butter
 List of dairy products

References 

Dairy products
Food ingredients
Butter